The 2010 Team Speedway Junior European Championship will be the third UEM Team Speedway Junior European Championship season. The Final took place on 8 August 2010 in Divišov, Czech Republic. The Championship was won by the defending Champion Poland (56 pts) who they beat Sweden (25 pts), host team Czech Republic (23 pts) and Ukraine (16 pts). It was second champion title for Patryk Dudek, Maciej Janowski and Przemysław Pawlicki.

Results

Heat details

Semi-Final One 
24 May 2010
 Norden, Lower Saxony
Motodrom Halbemond (Length: 396 m)
Referee and Jury President:  Istvan Darago
References

Semi-Final Two 
31 July 2010
  Chervonohrad, Lviv Oblast
Referee and Jury President:  K.Gardell
References

The Final 
7 August 2010
  Divišov, Central Bohemian Region
Referee:  Istvan Darago
Jury President:  Andrzej Grodzki
References

See also 
 2010 Team Speedway Junior World Championship
 2010 Individual Speedway Junior European Championship

References 

2010
European Team Junior